Officially known as Royal Brunei Air Force Base, Rimba,, commonly known as Rimba Air Force Base, abbreviated: , and occasionally known as Rimba Airbase; it is the military headquarters and main operating airbase of the Royal Brunei Air Force (RBAirF, originally  - ATUDB, from 2005 to  - TUDB).

History and operations
Aviation in the sultanate of Brunei arose due to a government desire to provide medical services in the rural areas of its territory.  Two Sikorsky S55 helicopters were contracted from the World Wide Helicopter Company to fly doctors by helicopter to remote areas, particularly those which were inaccessible by road.  In 1966, this service was taken over by three British pilots from the Royal Air Force (RAF), operating two RAF Westland Whirlwind helicopters, thereby signifying the start of military aviation in Brunei, officially becoming a helicopter platoon.  Three years later, in 1969, it was officially named the Air Wing.

In 1970, prior to Rimba Air Force Base, the military Air Wing of Brunei then started to operate a pair of Bell 205 helicopters from Berakas Garrison, forming No. 1 Squadron.  These were subsequently replaced in 1974 by Bell 212 helicopters.  No. 2 Squadron was formed in 1981, equipped with German Bolkow BO105 helicopters operating in the close air support (CAS) role.

In 1984, as a result of the independence of Brunei Darussalam from the United Kingdom (UK), the Air Wing came under the official command of Command Task Force, Royal Brunei Armed Forces (RBAF).  On 1 October 1991, the Air Wing, Royal Brunei Armed Forces became an independent service (air force) of Royal Brunei Armed Forces, and was officially named the Royal Brunei Air Force (RBAirF), or Angkatan Tentera Udara Diraja Brunei (ATUDB) in Malay.  It was also operating from Penanjong Garrison during this period.

1997 saw the arrival of Blackhawk S70A-14 helicopters, and more significantly, a fixed-wing aircraft, namely the CN 235 transport aircraft.  This resulted in the official formation of No. 4 Squadron and No. 5 Squadron on 12 September 1997.  Fixed-wing training aircraft were acquired in 1998, the Pilatus PC-7 Mk.II.  Security was enhanced on 4 January 1999, with the formation of an Air Regiment and a Base Defence Squadron.

Following the change on 1 January 2005 of the official Malay name of the Royal Brunei Air Force to Tentera Udara Diraja Brunei (TUDB), the first of the three ordered Sikorsky S-92s by Brunei Shell Petroleum (BSP) arrived at Air Force Base, Rimba, on 25 February 2007, before being transferred to Anduki Airfield (WBAK).  These aircraft were transported by an Antonov An-124 from Bradley International Airport, Windsor Locks, Connecticut, USA.  During BRIDEX 2011, the United States Air Force (USAF) made their first ever participation in the event, with General Dynamics F-16s from Misawa Air Base, Japan, conducting aerial demonstrations over Air Force Base, Rimba.  Additionally, the Republic of Singapore Air Force (RSAF) sent a Boeing CH-47SD/F Chinook for static display within Hangar B of the airbase.

On the morning of 20 July 2012, having departing Air Force Base, Rimba at 08:55, a RBAirF Bell 212 was due to return to the airbase later that same morning, but subsequently was found crashed with the loss of 12 out of 14 military personnel in Rampayoh, Mukim Labi.  Investigations by the Supreme Board of Inquiry of the Royal Brunei Armed Forces (RBAF) concluded that the crash was caused by human error whilst in flight; specifically 'unauthorised low-level flying' which resulted in a controlled flight into terrain (CFIT).

The fourth BRIDEX meet in 2013 seen the introduction of the newer Blackhawk variant into the Royal Brunei Air Force, the Blackhawk S70i, unveiled by His Majesty the Sultan of Brunei.  This new acquisition of the S70i marked the end and retirement of the entire fleet of Bell 212, which spanned forty years service in the RBAirF.  BRIDEX 2013 also had participation from the United States of America, by sending a single USAF C-17 Globemaster III of the 545th Airlift Squadron from Joint Base Pearl Harbor–Hickam, Hawaii, a United States Marine Corps (USMC) MV-22B Osprey, and a KC-130J Super Hercules.

On 24 February 2016, eight Republic of Korea Air Force (RoKAF) KAI T-50B of the 53rd Air Demonstration Group, 'Black Eagles' made a planned refuelling stop at the airbase, and later on 24 June, the RBAirF revealed a 50th anniversary monument at the Air Movement Centre (AMC), Air Force Base, Rimba.  Later that year on 16 November 2016, four Royal Air Force (RAF) Eurofighter Typhoon multi-role fighter jets supported by an RAF Voyager tanker-transport visited the airbase.  On 18 July 2017, an RAF A400M Atlas C1 from No. 70 Squadron RAF visited the airbase, and later from 27 until 29 July 2017, the Japan Air-Self Defense Force (JASDF) Boeing KC-767 made a goodwill visit to the base.

On 24 September 2019, Royal Brunei Air Force Base, Rimba was one of the locations used as a training area for Exercise Setia Bersama (Loyal Together) 1/2019, the nationwide ten-day military exercise conducted by the Royal Brunei Armed Forces (RBAF) in Brunei Darussalam.  Military assets from various parts of the RBAF test and assess their level of preparedness at both operational and tactical levels, and cooperated with other agencies and 'grassroots' leaders from all districts of Brunei, and included all military camp bases.  A United States and Brunei joint exercise Cooperation Afloat Readiness and Training (CARAT) was held at the base on 22 October 2019.  Also noted during CARAT 2019, a USAF P-8A Poseidon operated by Patrol Squadron (VP) 10 was present at the airbase.

On 2 November 2019 at 16:55, the main gate of Royal Brunei Air Force Base, Rimba was damaged when a man in a hijacked car used it to ram into the main gate "a few times".  The car, with a young boy inside, was hijacked by 24 year old Muhammad Firdaus bin Mohammad Salleh, and the impact caused the main gate to fall, which then damaged two cars parked nearby.  Bin Mohammad Salleh failed to enter a plea to the charge of 'committing an act endangering the lives of the public' when appearing at the Magistrates' Court on 4 November 2019.  The defendant could face a fine and up to three years imprisonment if convicted, his case was referred to the Deputy Public Prosecutor for a further hearing on 11 November 2019, which was then adjourned by three weeks until 2 December.  On 8 February 2021, local man bin Mohamad Salleh was given a custodial sentence of two years six months imprisonment plus three strokes of the cane after pleading guilty at the High Court.  The damage caused to the main gates was assessed to be over BND 8,000.

On 14 May 2020, medical supplies donated by China to help combat the COVID-19 pandemic in Brunei arrived at Royal Brunei Air Force Base, Rimba, on board an Ilyushin IL-76 from the China's People's Liberation Army Air Force (PLAAF).  The Air Movements Centre (AMC) at Rimba processed the 128 boxes of medical equipment, which included laboratory and thermal screening equipment (testing kits and ventilator support equipment), personal protective equipment (PPE), and sanitising and disinfectant products.

From 26 until 28 January 2021, the Royal Brunei Air Force's Fire Service Flight of No. 3 Wing RBAirF completed an Aviation Rescue Fire Fighting (ARFF) Exercise at the Royal Brunei Air Force Base, Rimba.  Aside from testing the competency and effectiveness of the firefighting crews and associated emergency services, its aim was also to refine and produce an updated Standard Operating Procedure (SOP).  On 25 June 2021, a parade was held at the Air Movement Centre (AMC), Rimba, in celebration of the RBAF 55th anniversary.  Of note was the introduction of Integrator into the RBAirF, a drone unmanned aerial system (UAS).  The decommissioning ceremony of the RBAirF's Bolkow 105 fleet was held at the AMC within the Air Force Base, Rimba, on 5 February 2022.  First introduced as a fleet of six helicopters into No. 2 Squadron, Air Wing in 1981, administered and maintained by the Royal Electrical and Mechanical Engineers (REME) from the UK until 1993, this ended 41 years' service of the type as latterly operated by No. 1 Wing, Operations Group.

At Royal Brunei Air Force Base, Rimba, from 24 until 26 January 2023, Major (U) Muhammad Isyhak bin Haji Ismail, Acting Commanding Officer of No. 2 Wing RBAirF, took part in a three-day Air Domain Awareness Subject Matter Expert Exchange via videoconference to the Pacific Integrated Air and Missile Defence (IAMD) Centre.

Current units
Royal Brunei Air Force Base, Rimba is currently home (or parent) to the following units.

No. 1 Wing RBAirF – (Operations Group)

All 1 Wing units are based at Rimba.
No. 11 Squadron – previously known as 1 Squadron, operating 12 Blackhawk S70i helicopters (replacing its former Bell 212 fleet)
No. 12 Squadron – previously known as 2 Squadron, operated the Bolkow BO105 until its retirement
No. 14 Squadron – previously known as 4 Squadron, operating the Blackhawk S70A and Blackhawk S70i helicopters in the training role
No. 15 Squadron – operating the medium-lift fixed-wing CN 235 transport aircraft in the cargo, troop transport, paratroop drop, and patrol (maritime and border) roles

No. 2 Wing RBAirF – (Air Defence Battery)
As well as operational roles, 2 Wing also provides administrative and support functions.
No. 238 Squadron – previously known as 38 Squadron, based at Berakas Garrison, 238 Sqn operates Mistral, its Very Short Range Air Defence System (VSHORAD) weapon system
No. 233 Squadron – previously known as 33 Squadron, originally based at Penanjong Garrison, it used to operate the Rapier FSB1, a Short Range Air Defence system until its decommissioning in 2010; 233 Sqn is now a support to 238 Squadron preparing for its new air defence system
No. 236 Squadron – based at Rimba, 236 Sqn is tasked with protecting the base from air and ground threats
Engineering Squadron – based at Berakas Garrison, Engineering Sqn provides maintenance support for all operational Air Defence squadrons

No. 3 Wing RBAirF
No. 31 Squadron (PATDU) – the Parachute Airborne Tactical Delivery Unit consists of the Jungle Rescue Team, and provides tactical supply into the jungles of Brunei
Fire Brigade Unit – provides fire fighting services and related duties for aircraft and infrastructure
Air Movement Flight – AMF controls all flight movements at Rimba, including cargo
Airspace Control – working for the Department of Civil Aviation (DCA), this unit controls all aircraft throughout Brunei airspace, and recruits qualified air traffic controllers

No. 4 Wing RBAirF – (Supply Headquarter)
4 Wing is commonly known as Supply Headquarter, and is directly responsible to the Support Group Commander.
Domestic Supply Squadron – operates in a manner similar to a Regimental Quartermaster
Technical Supply Squadron – responsible for all technical supplies for the entire Royal Brunei Air Force; at its Main Store (in the 4 Wing main building) and Forward Stores (in Hangars A and B, along with 38 Sqn stores)
Supply Control & Accounting Flight – SCAF provides administrative functions to all elements of supply operations through its five cells: Control Accounting Cell (CAC), Supply Accounting Cell (SAC), Supply Control Cell (SCC), Receipt and Despatch (R&D), and the Bulk Fuel Installation Account

No. 5 Wing RBAirF – (Maintenance Wing)
5 Wing is the Maintenance Wing for the entire Royal Brunei Air Force, tasked with all operational and training requirements along with maintenance deadlines and handling aircraft maintenance related matters.
No. 51 Squadron – engineering squadron, responsible for the Blackhawk S70i fleet
No. 52 Squadron – engineering squadron, responsible for the Bolkow BO105 until their decommission
No. 53 Squadron – engineering squadron, responsible for the Bell 206 Jet Ranger
No. 54 Squadron – engineering squadron, responsible for the Blackhawk S70A
No. 55 Squadron – engineering squadron, responsible for the CN 235
Engineering Support Flight – provides support to all aircraft and related equipment for the entire RBAirF
Ground Support Equipment
Survival Equipment Section
Flight Line Mechanics
Engineering Standard Cell – responsible for all aircraft maintenance standards and documentation
Engineering Planning and Control – tasked with all documenting and updating all maintenance activities
Maintenance Planning Resources Management – forecasts future maintenance and allocates resources
Technical Equipment Maintenance Division – civilian section responsible for aircraft major maintenance and inspection

No. 6 Wing RBAirF – (Administrative and Base Maintenance)
6 Wings' main role is to manage administrative issues and base maintenance in relating to the Royal Brunei Air Force operations, together with managing personnel welfare.
Regimental Police Fleet – protects the airbase from unauthorised entry
Pay Flight
Base Maintenance
Estate Maintenance Section
Medical Reception Service
Light Aid Detachment
Dental
Military Transport Flight – provides all military vehicles for land transport

No. 7 Wing RBAirF – (Training School)
7 Wing is responsible for the training, administration, and welfare management of all Royal Brunei Air Force personnel, and is also an establishment for Leadership courses to fulfil the needs of the RBAirF.
No. 73 Squadron – originally known as the Flying Training School in the 1980s, through various renames to its current 73 Sqn, this provides basic and elementary flight training to all RBAirF student pilots, on both fixed-wing and rotary-wing aircraft, along with aircrew training
No. 77 Squadron – based at Berakas Garrison, 77 Sqn provides Air Defence training courses to personnel of No. 2 Wing RBAirF, and also all other personnel of the Royal Brunei Armed Forces.

Gate guardians
Royal Brunei Air Force Base, Rimba displays a retired Bell UH-1 helicopter (military version of the Bell 212) as its gate guardian on a traffic island roundabout just inside its main gate.

See also
Bolkiah Garrison — main base and headquarters of the Royal Brunei Land Forces
Muara Naval Base — main base and headquarters of the Royal Brunei Navy

References

External links

Aviation in Brunei
Brunei-Muara District
Establishments in Brunei
Royal Brunei Air Force